The Goh Chok Tong Cabinet, came in for the fourth from 2001 general elections to 2004.

Ministers

References

 

Executive branch of the government of Singapore
Lists of political office-holders in Singapore
Cabinets established in 1997